Palinurus elephas is a commonly caught species of spiny lobster from the East Atlantic Ocean and the Mediterranean Sea. Its common names include European spiny lobster, crayfish or cray (in Ireland), crawfish (in England), common spiny lobster, Mediterranean lobster and red lobster.

Distribution and habitat
Palinurus elephas is a common species of spiny lobster, found in the eastern Atlantic Ocean, from southern Norway to Morocco and the Azores,  and in the Mediterranean Sea, except its eastern extremes. It is named after the ancient Roman Tyrrhenian sea port of Palinurus (modern day Palinuro, Campania, Italy) where they are found in abundance off its promontory.

Description

Few achieve their maximum weight of several kilograms.

The adults are reddish-brown with yellow spots. The carapace is slightly compressed and lacks lateral ridges. It is covered with forward pointing spines, with the supraorbital spines prominent. The antennae are very heavy and spiny, are tapering and even longer than the body. The first walking leg (pereopod) is provided with subchela (the distal end of a limb developed as a prehensile structure). The fourth segment (merus) of this leg has a characteristic row of spines.

Reproduction
The breeding season is in September and October, with the female brooding the reddish eggs. These eggs hatch about six months later in the spring as flattened, leaf-shaped, planktonic larvae (phyllosoma larvae). P. elephas goes through ten phyllosoma stages and a puerulus stage before adulthood.

Diet
It is nocturnal and feeds on small worms, crabs or dead animals, hiding in rock crevices or caves during the day.

Uses
It is a much sought-after delicacy and is widely caught for food around the Mediterranean Sea, mostly with lobster pots, and is also caught less intensively off the Atlantic Coasts of Ireland, Portugal, France and England. There are also small fisheries for this species on the west coast of Scotland, employing tangle nets or lobster pots.

References

External links

 

Achelata
Crustaceans of the Atlantic Ocean
Fauna of the Mediterranean Sea
Edible crustaceans
Commercial crustaceans
Crustaceans described in 1787
Taxa named by Johan Christian Fabricius
Articles containing video clips